Matt F. Delmont is an American professor of history and author. He is the Sherman Fairchild Distinguished Professor of History at Dartmouth College and former Professor of History at Arizona State University (ASU) and Scripps College.

Early life and education
Delmont earned his Bachelor of Arts degree from Harvard University before enrolling in Brown University for his Master's degree and Ph.D. in American Studies.

Career
Upon earning his PhD, Delmont accepted a position as an Assistant professor of American studies at Scripps College. During his short tenure at Scripps, he was the recipient of the 2011 Professor of the Year Award and published his book The Nicest Kids in Town: American Bandstand, Rock n’ Roll, and the Struggle for Civil Rights in 1950s Philadelphia through the University of California Press. In his book, he discredits claims by the late Dick Clark, host and producer of American Bandstand, that the show was a pioneer of on-air racial politics and integration. As part of his research into the discontent of the show around racial politics, he interviewed 21 Philadelphia natives who had attended, watched, or protested the TV show. He published historical accounts of American Bandstand incorporating and encouraging systematic marginalization of local African American fans and musicians throughout its running.

By June 2014, Delmont left Scripps College and accepted a position at Arizona State University (ASU) as a professor in their history department. During his tenure at ASU, Delmont published his second book titled Making roots: A nation captivated through the University of California Press. The book explored the history and creation of the 1977 miniseries Roots. In the same year, he also published Why Busing Failed: Race, Media, and the National Resistance to School Desegregation, a historical review of America's desegregated school bussing and overall educational equality policy. Following the publication of his second and third books, Delmont was promoted to Director of ASU's School of Historical, Philosophical and Religious Studies and awarded a Guggenheim Fellowship to continue his research on African-American racial struggles in America.

Delmont eventually left ASU to become the Sherman Fairchild Distinguished Professor of History at Dartmouth College in 2019. In his first year at Dartmouth, the Stanford University Press published Delmont's mutli-year project Black Quotidian. The goal of the project was to create an open-access multimedia free archive that featured 1,000 media objects from African-American newspapers, audio clips, and videos during historical moments in of black resistance in American history. Beyond the archive, he published Black Quotidian: Everyday History in African-American Newspapers, which won the Garfinkel Prize. The digital book drew from the collected archived material and media and applied it into a scholarly context.

References

External links

Living people
Arizona State University faculty
Dartmouth College faculty
Scripps College faculty
Brown University alumni
Harvard University alumni
Year of birth missing (living people)